Daejin University is a private university located in Pocheon, Gyeonggi Province, South Korea. It was founded by Daesun Jinrihoe in November 1991 and opened in March 1992.

The university operates Daejin University China Campus, a study abroad program based at the campuses of two universities in China: Soochow University and Harbin Normal University.

Academics

Undergraduate courses of study are divided among six colleges:  Culture, Humanities, Social Sciences, Natural Sciences, Sciences and Engineering, and Arts.   Training is also provided at the graduate level, through specialized graduate schools of Education, Industry, Business Administration and Legal Affairs.

History

The university was established in 1991 by the Daesun Jinrihoe, a Korean religious group.  The location was chosen due to its position near the midpoint of the line connecting Halla-san with Baekdu-san, and thus at the symbolic heart of the Korean peninsula.

Notable alumni

See also
List of colleges and universities in South Korea
Education in South Korea

References

External links
Official school website, in English and Korean

Universities and colleges in Gyeonggi Province
1992 establishments in South Korea
Educational institutions established in 1992